László Gyetvai (11 December 1918 – 28 August 2013) was a Hungarian professional footballer who played as a forward for Ferencváros and the Hungary national team.

Death
Gyetvai died on 28 August 2013 in Budapest at the age of 94. He was the oldest living Hungarian international footballer.

References

1918 births
2013 deaths
Hungarian footballers
Hungarian football managers
Footballers from Budapest
Association football forwards
Ferencvárosi TC footballers
Hungary international footballers
Sportspeople from Zvolen